Parsons Mine, historically known as the Hopeful Lode, near Nogal, New Mexico, was listed on the National Register of Historic Places in 1995.  With , it was listed as "Hopeful Lode".

One third of the site is owned by Parsons Mining Company;  the rest is part of Lincoln National Forest. The portion north of 108 includes four adits, an open cut (or glory hole), large waste piles, and two prospect pits.

It was listed for its information potential as an archeological site "for its ability to yield knowledge about early mining technologies, and the communities these mines engendered. The Parsons Mine site retains integrity of location, setting, feeling and association."

References

		
National Register of Historic Places in Lincoln County, New Mexico
Mines in New Mexico
Archaeological sites in New Mexico